Burnham Beeches is a  biological Site of Special Scientific Interest situated west of Farnham Common in the village of Burnham, Buckinghamshire. The southern half is owned by the Corporation of London and is open to the public. It is also a National Nature Reserve and a Special Area of Conservation.

Preservation

The largely beech woodland has been regularly pollarded, with many trees now several hundred years old. Their age, and the amount of deadwood in and around them, means that the woodland is rich in wildlife. More than sixty of the species of plants and animals here are either rare or under threat nationally. The area is protected as a National Nature Reserve, Site of Special Scientific Interest and a candidate Special Area of Conservation.

Archaeology
Seven Ways Plain hill fort is located in the south west part of Burnham Beeches. it is a rare example of a single rampart earthwork used either as a stock enclosures or possibly places of refuge. It comprises a range of earthworks which have been dated to the Late Bronze Age and Early Iron Age. It is a Scheduled Monument.

Filming
The close proximity of Pinewood, Shepperton and Bray Studios and the outstanding natural beauty of the Beeches have made it a desirable filming location. Robin Hood Prince of Thieves, The Crying Game, First Knight, Goldfinger, The Princess Bride, the 1952 Disney film The Story of Robin Hood and His Merrie Men, Harry Potter and the Order of the Phoenix and Harry Potter and the Deathly Hallows – Part 1, Maleficent: Mistress of Evil, Horrible Histories: The Movie, and the Doctor Who story State of Decay are some of the films and TV productions that have been shot at Burnham Beeches.

Filming is tightly controlled in recognition of the Beeches' international importance for wildlife. Filming is restricted to no more than twenty days per year and to certain times of year. Filming in environmentally sensitive areas has also been banned. Revenue from filming goes directly to fund the upkeep and management of the Beeches.

Affiliates
Burnham, New Zealand, was named after the village of Burnham.

Burnham Beeches F.C. are an amateur football team who currently compete in the East Berkshire Football League.

See also

Burnham railway station (formerly Burnham Beeches railway station)
Dropmore Park
English Lowlands beech forests

References

External links

IMDb list of film and television productions which have used Burnham Beeches

Burnham, Buckinghamshire
Sites of Special Scientific Interest in Buckinghamshire
Hill forts in Buckinghamshire
Parks and open spaces of the City of London Corporation
Forests and woodlands of Buckinghamshire
National nature reserves in England
Special Areas of Conservation in England